Seth Twum is a former Ghanaian Supreme Court Judge. He served on the Supreme Court bench from 2002 to 2007.

Biography
Twum was born on 20 March 1937. He had his secondary education at Achimota School.

He was nominated in July 2002 and was vetted in September that same year. A month later, he was approved by parliament and was sworn into office in November that year together with Justice Georgina Theodora Wood, Justice Stephen Alan Brobbey and Justice Samuel Glenn Baddoo by the then president John Agyekum Kufour. He retired on 20 March 2007 at the mandatory retirement age of seventy (70) years.

Twum died in 2022. He was buried on 1 July 2022.

See also
 List of judges of the Supreme Court of Ghana
 Supreme Court of Ghana

References

1937 births
Living people
Alumni of Achimota School
Justices of the Supreme Court of Ghana